Joseph "Gunnar" Bentz (born January 3, 1996) is an American former competitive swimmer and Olympic gold medalist.

Early life
Bentz graduated from St. Pius X Catholic High School in 2014.

Career
Bentz is a four-time medalist (two gold, two bronze) at the FINA World Junior Swimming Championships and a two-time medalist (one silver, one bronze) at the Pan American Games. 

In American collegiate swimming, Bentz competed for the University of Georgia on the Georgia Bulldogs swimming and diving team. He was the 2015 USA National Champion in the 400m Individual Medley. In June 2016, he qualified for the 4 × 200 m freestyle relay at the 2016 Summer Olympics. Bentz swam in the preliminaries of the 4 × 200 m freestyle relay at the 2016 Summer Olympics. Replaced by the team of Michael Phelps, Ryan Lochte, Conor Dwyer, and Townley Haas, Bentz was not in the final but received a medal.

In 2018, Bentz qualified for the 2019 Pan American Games in Lima, Peru.

Gas station incident during 2016 Olympics

On the morning of August 14, Bentz's teammate Ryan Lochte claimed that he, Bentz, Jack Conger, and Jimmy Feigen were robbed after four men forced them out of their taxi at gunpoint. Bentz, 20 at the time of this incident, was required to be back in the Olympic Village by 1:00 am as the 1:00 am curfew was relaxed just for team members 21 or older by Frank Busch, U.S.A. Swimming's national team director. The Brazilian authorities questioned this account, and after Lochte had flown home on August 16, Bentz and Conger were prevented from leaving the country and their passports were seized; this was done in order to have them testify as witnesses of the incident. Civil Police of Rio de Janeiro concluded that the athletes were not robbed, but instead had been involved in an incident at a gas station in Barra da Tijuca, west of the city. This investigation found that the swimmers stopped at a gas station near Casa França, where they were involved in a confrontation with security guards regarding vandalism some or all of the swimmers had caused in a bathroom while intoxicated. They also claimed that the swimmers had already paid in cash 100 reais ($31) and $20 in U.S. currency as compensation for objects from the bathroom which were damaged, such as a soap holder, a mirror, and a "Please Do Not Enter" sign.

Bentz and Conger later admitted that Lochte's robbery story was fabricated. The Associated Press reported that Bentz and Conger "refuted Lochte's claim that the group was held up by armed assailants".

After Bentz returned to the United States, he released a statement about the incident. He admitted to urinating behind the gas station, and wrote that Lochte pulled down a framed metal advertisement, but denied witnessing any damage caused to the bathroom.

International Swimming League 
In 2019 Bentz was member of the 2019 International Swimming League, representing Team Iron.

2020 Olympic Trials 
In 2021, Bentz qualified for the 2020 Olympic Team, placing 2nd in the 200m butterfly at the finals of the US Olympic Team Trials.

Career best times

Long course (50-meter pool)

References

External links
 
 
 
 
 
 

1996 births
Living people
American male freestyle swimmers
American male medley swimmers
Georgia Bulldogs men's swimmers
Swimmers from Atlanta
Pan American Games silver medalists for the United States
Swimmers at the 2016 Summer Olympics
Olympic gold medalists for the United States in swimming
Medalists at the 2016 Summer Olympics
Prisoners and detainees of Brazil
Pan American Games medalists in swimming
Swimmers at the 2015 Pan American Games
Medalists at the 2015 Pan American Games
Swimmers at the 2020 Summer Olympics
21st-century American people